Franco Ziliani (Francesco Ziliani, born 09/23/1956 in Milan, died in 2021) is an Italian journalist, blogger and wine critic, with a specialty in Italian wines since 1985. He has contributed to several periodicals including Decanter, A Tavola, Barolo & Co. and Merum, Il Corriere Vinicolo, De Vinis, The World of Fine Wine, as well as a column for Harpers Magazine with Nicolas Belfrage MW with whom he has also contributed to Tom Stevenson's annual Wine Report. Ziliani and  Jeremy Parzen launched VinoWire.com in March 2008, to provide an English language news service on the subject of Italian wine. Ziliani has since been credited by La Repubblica with first breaking the 2008 Brunello scandal.

Ziliani has often criticised Angelo Gaja and his style of winemaking, and frequently and controversially refers to James Suckling as "Giacomino Suckling" and his employer publication Wine Spectator as "Wine Speculator".

A right-winger, Ziliani has been harshly criticized after he publicly declared he won't ever again review Giovanna Maccario's wines as a punishment for her pro-immigration stance.

See also
Italian wine
List of wine personalities

References

External links
VinoWire Italian wine news
Vino al vino: Franco Ziliani blog 
Barolo di Barolo 

1956 births
Living people
Wine critics